Axiom was an Australian rock band formed in Melbourne, Victoria, in 1969 that included former Twilights frontman Glenn Shorrock and Brian Cadd, formerly of The Groop.

Biography
Axiom's formation was a by-product of the annual Hoadley's Battle of the Sounds, in which the top Australian bands of the day performed in front of judges for the prize of a paid return trip to London. The Twilights were the first winners, in 1967, followed the next year by The Groop. Both bands found it difficult to return to the Australian pop scene after their time in London. While neither of the bands had had much success in London, their experience performing had inspired them to continue pursuing a music career in Australia. 

The Groop broke up in late 1969, by which time the Twilights had already split-up, and singer Glenn Shorrock had moved into management. A plan was made to form a new group out of the two groups' frontline remnants. Twilights' songwriter and guitarist Terry Britten was supposed to join Shorrock and The Groop's piano player and chief songwriter, Brian Cadd, in the new band. But when Britten chose to go to England instead, his place was taken by The Groop's Don Mudie, with whom Cadd had a strong song writing partnership. The group was completed by Cam-Pact guitarist Chris Stockley, and Valentines drummer Doug Lavery. Immediately dubbed a supergroup, the band asked fans to suggest a name and settled on Axiom.

After signing with EMI's Parlophone label, Axiom immediately set to work in the recording studio. In December 1969, the group released their first single, "Arkansas Grass", heavily influenced by The Band's album Music from Big Pink. Though the title of the single superficially appealed to international markets, and its Civil War theme reflected Cadd's current obsession with the music of The Band, it was in fact a coded anti-Vietnam war song – and in that respect addressed a very Australian concern, since Australian men were at the time being drafted to fight in the Vietnam war. "Arkansas Grass" reached No. 7 in December 1969.

Midway through the recording of the LP, which was released under the title Fool's Gold, drummer Don Lebler (the Avengers) replaced Doug Lavery. Axiom left Australia for the UK in April 1970 after signing a publishing deal from Leeds Music, with the local music press reporting that they had received record deal offers from both Apple Records and the Decca label. As a parting gift they left their second single, "A Little Ray of Sunshine", inspired by the birth of either Mudie's daughter or Cadd's niece. The single reached No. 5 in April 1970. "A Little Ray of Sunshine" has become one of the Australian songs most often still played on radio and was even celebrated with its own stamp in Australia Post's 1998 Australian Rock stamp series.

Fool's Gold was also one of the first attempts in Australian pop to write songs about the Australian landscape and Australian places. It is also notable as one of the first Australian albums on a major label to be self-produced by the recording artist, and also featured one of the first uses of the didgeridoo in Australian popular music. Fool's Gold reached No. 18 in June, despite a lack of promotion by Axiom. A third single failed to chart. In Australia, Axiom were signed to Ron Tudor's independent production company. They left Australia with Tudor's approval to try to secure a worldwide recording contract.

Although many of the songs on Fool's Gold featured Australian references, Brian Cadd revealed years later that the track "Ford's Bridge" had a very different origin:

" ... we wrote a song, which must have been all the stuff that I had left in my head from 'Arkansas Grass', which I called 'We Can Reach Georgia by Morning'. We had done some rough mixes and somebody played some of them to Stan Rofe and Rofe got right off his bike about it and said that it was absolutely unconscionable for us to use Georgia and why couldn't we use an Australian name? So I succumbed to the browbeating of everybody, and we found in the atlas a place in Northern Queensland called Fords Bridge, which had the right meter for the words ... I never really got over that. It really hurt me, It annoyed me ... I just got very annoyed with the parochialism. When it reached out and touched me and made me change a word in a song. I hated it."

In England, Axiom signed a three-year recording contract with Warners, cemented by a single "My Baby's Gone" produced by Shel Talmy of early Who, Kinks and Easybeats' "Friday on My Mind" fame. The band completed a second album, If Only, recorded at the iconic Olympic Studios in London. Although some former members were later critical of what they felt was Talmy's overproduction of the record, in a 2000 interview with Richie Unterberger, Talmy still spoke highly of both group and LP:

"Warner Brothers hired me to record them. Super-duper band. It was a super album. Two weeks before the album was to be released on Warner, they decided to break up. And they did, and Warners said, "Bye!! If you think we're promoting this album, you're out of your fucking minds!" I was real pleased with that album. It was fun to do, they were talented, the songs were great."

By the time the album was released, the band had already broken up.

Glenn Shorrock remained in England where he performed as lead vocalist of the band Esperanto, eventually returning to Australia in 1974 to join the nascent Little River Band. Brian Cadd returned to Australia and launched a successful solo career. Don Lebler remained in the UK to become a member of The Mixtures. A couple of years later, Chris Stockley became part of The Dingoes. In October 2010, Fool's Gold (1970) was listed in the book 100 Best Australian Albums.

Members
 Glenn Shorrock – vocals, guitar
 Brian Cadd – vocals, piano
 Don Mudie – bass
 Chris Stockley – guitar
 Don Lebler – drums

Discography

Albums

Extended plays

Singles

Awards and nominations

Go-Set Pop Poll
The Go-Set Pop Poll was coordinated by teen-oriented pop music newspaper Go-Set, and was established in February 1966 and conducted an annual poll during 1966 to 1972 of its readers to determine the most popular personalities.

|-
| 1970
| themselves 
| Best Australian Group
| style="background:silver;"| 2nd
|-

References

 Australian Encyclopedia of Rock & Pop article

External links
 Howlspace.com
 Miles Ago

Australian rock music groups
Australian supergroups
Musical groups established in 1969
Musical groups disestablished in 1971
Rock music supergroups
Victoria (Australia) musical groups